The Ambassador of Australia to Greece is an officer of the Australian Department of Foreign Affairs and Trade and the head of the Embassy of the Commonwealth of Australia to the Hellenic Republic. The Ambassador resides in Athens and holds non-resident accreditation for Bulgaria and Romania. From 2004 to 2013, accreditation was also held for Albania, when it reverted to the Embassy in Rome.

The current ambassador, since December 2019, is Arthur Spyrou.

List of ambassadors

Notes
 Also non-resident Australian Ambassador to Romania, since 18 March 1968.
 Also non-resident Australian Ambassador to the Republic of Bulgaria, since 5 April 1972.
 Also non-resident Australian Ambassador to the Republic of Albania, 2004 to 2013.

References

 
 
 
 
Greece
Australia